"One Day, One Dream" is Tackey & Tsubasa's third single under the Avex Trax label. This is the third retail single for their 2wenty 2wo album.

Overview
The a-side song "One Day, One Dream" was used as the 5th opening theme song to the anime InuYasha. The b-side "Deep into Blue" was used as the House Commodity "Dongari Corn" commercial song. The other b-side "Arugamama" was TBS TV "Golden Muscle" ending theme song.

Sample of the translated lyrics:
 (You can now, dream)
Brandishing a brave dream
 (Go in and try)
a forcible try and repeating worries
You move toward the endless days too
 (Do you need to cry?)
Do we cry identically? Loneliness too
 (Show me, a day, fight)
Fight up front, and every time you cry,
become steady with your dream

Track listing

Regular CD Format
 "One Day, One Dream" (Hideyuki Obata, Kei Yoshikawa) - 4:24
 "Deep into Blue" (Imai Tsubasa) (Batu Bulan, Tetsuhiko Suzuki, Tomoji Sogawa) - 4:22
 "" (Takizawa Hideaki) (Sumiyo Mutsumi, Masatoshi Sakashita) - 4:20
 "" (Hitoshi Haba) - 4:20
 "One Day, One Dream ~karaoke~" - 4:24

Limited CD Format
 "One Day, One Dream" (Hideyuki Obata, Kei Yoshikawa) - 4:24
 "Deep into Blue" (Imai Tsubasa) (Batu Bulan, Tetsuhiko Suzuki, Tomoji Sogawa) - 4:22
 "" (Takizawa Hideaki) (Sumiyo Mutsumi, Masatoshi Sakashita) - 4:19
 "One Day, One Dream: Takizawa Part Version" - 4:24
 "One Day, One Dream: Tsubasa Part Version" - 4:24
 "One Day, One Dream: karaoke" - 4:24
 "Brand New World" - 4:14

Personnel
 Takizawa Hideaki - vocals
 Imai Tsubasa - vocals

Charts
Oricon Sales Chart (Japan)

RIAJ Certification
As of March 2004, "One Day, One Dream" has been certified gold for shipments of over 100,000 by the Recording Industry Association of Japan.

References 
 
 

2004 singles
2004 songs
Tackey & Tsubasa songs
Avex Trax singles
Inuyasha songs
Oricon Weekly number-one singles